The men's team foil was one of eight fencing events on the fencing at the 1980 Summer Olympics programme. It was the fifteenth appearance of the event. The competition was held from 25 to 26 July 1980. 40 fencers from 9 nations competed.

Rosters

Results

Round 1

Round 1 Pool A 

Romania and the Soviet Union each defeated Great Britain, 12–4 and 13–3, respectively. The two victors then faced off. The Soviet Union won 9–2.

Round 1 Pool B 

Cuba and Hungary tied at 8–8, with 58 touches apiece. France then defeated both of the other teams, 10–6 each.

Round 1 Pool C 

East Germany and Poland each defeated Kuwait, 14–2 and 15–1, respectively. The two victors then faced off. Poland won 9–5.

Elimination rounds

References

Foil team
Men's events at the 1980 Summer Olympics